Novolipetsk Steel, or NLMK, is one of the four largest steel companies in Russia. NLMK's share of domestic crude steel production is about 21%. It primarily produces flat steel products, semi-finished steel products and electrical steels. NLMK also produces specialty coated steels, plus high-ductility and micro-alloyed steels. It is the 21st-largest steel maker in the world. The larger NLMK group owns a number of other steel and mining industries, mostly in Russia.

History

Historically, the Lipetsk area in central Russia has had substantial iron ore deposits. In 1702, Peter the Great ordered the construction of an iron foundry there.

In 1931, Novolipetsk Iron and Steel began construction of a plant on the site of the iron ore mine. Prospering down through the decades, Novolipetsk became a joint-stock company in 1992 and then in 1993 began the process of privatization by distributing company shares to its employees. The company seems to be acquisitive; see list of related organizations. In 1998, Vladimir Lisin became the chairman. The manufacturing area in Lipetsk covers 27 square kilometers.

Less than half of NLMK's output of steel is sold in Russia.

The company's primary source of iron ore is now Stoilensky GOK, a company which is 350 km from the mills at Lipetsk.

Business

Acquisitions
The largest of NLMK's acquisitions was a 50% stake in a joint venture with the Duferco Group in December 2006. The venture includes one steel plant and five rolling mills in Western Europe and the United States. The joint venture also includes service and distribution facilities located in Europe.

Other acquisitions include:

 OJSC Dolomite, miner and processor of metallurgical dolomite, acquired in 1997
 OJSC Stagdok, miner and processor of fluxing limestone, acquired in 1999
 OJSC Stoilensky GOK, iron ore supplier, acquired in 2004 (97%)
 OJSC TMTP, operator of the Black Sea port of Tuapse, acquired in 2004 (controlling interest)
 License for the large coking coal deposit Zhernovskoie 1 in the Kuzbass region of Russia, acquired at State auction in 2005
 DanSteel A/S, Danish steel rolling company, acquired in 2006
 OJSC Altai-koks, acquired in 2006
 VIZ-Stal, the second-largest Russian electrical steel producer, acquired in 2006
 Sharon Coatings

Ecology
Since 2007 NLMK has implemented a number of investment projects on environmental protection. In 2009 it stopped discharges of industrial wastewater into the river Voronezh. As the result of all the activities, the water consumption of the NLMK Group decreased from 120.4 million cubic meters per year in 2008 to 77.2 million cubic meters per year in 2012, and emissions into the atmosphere decreased by 40%.

NLMK reported Total CO2e emissions (Direct + Indirect) for the twelve months ending 31 December 2020 at 33,587 kilotonnes(+1,365/+4.2% y-o-y).

See also

 List of steel producers

References

External links
 Official site - English-language version

Steel companies of Russia
Companies listed on the London Stock Exchange
Steel companies of the Russian Soviet Federative Socialist Republic
Companies listed on the Moscow Exchange
Manufacturing companies established in 1931
Russian brands
1931 establishments in Russia
Companies based in Lipetsk Oblast